The College of Science and Engineering (CSE) is one of the colleges of the University of Minnesota in Minneapolis, Minnesota.  On July 1, 2010, the college was officially renamed from the Institute of Technology (IT). It was created in 1935 by bringing together the university's programs in engineering, mining, architecture, and chemistry. Today, CSE contains 12 departments and 24 research centers that focus on engineering, the physical sciences, and mathematics.

Rankings
The programs offered by the College of Science and Engineering are rated among the best in the nation, particularly in Chemical Engineering, Aerospace Engineering, and Mechanical Engineering.

Departments

 Aerospace Engineering and Mechanics
 Biomedical Engineering
 Chemical Engineering and Materials Science
 Chemistry
 Civil, Environmental, and GeoEngineering
 Computer Science and Engineering
 Earth Sciences (formerly called Geology and Geophysics)
 Electrical and Computer Engineering
 Industrial and Systems Engineering
 Mathematics
 Mechanical Engineering
 Physics and Astronomy
Additionally, CSE pairs with other departments at the University to offer degree-granting programs in:
 Bioproducts and Biosystems Engineering, with CFANS (formerly two departments: Biosystems and Agricultural Engineering, and Bio-based Products)
 Statistics
And two other CSE units grant advanced degrees:
 Technological Leadership Institute (formerly Center for the Development of Technological Leadership)
 History of Science and Technology

Research centers
 BioTechnology Institute
 Characterization Facility
 Charles Babbage Institute - CBI website
 Digital Technology Center
 William I. Fine Theoretical Physics Institute
 Industrial Partnership for Research in Interfacial and Materials Engineering
 Institute for Mathematics and its Applications
 Minnesota Nano Center
 NSF Engineering Research Center for Compact and Efficient Fluid Power
 NSF Materials Research Science and Engineering Center
 NSF Multi-Axial Subassemblage Testing (MAST) System
 NSF National Center for Earth-surface Dynamics (NCED)
 The Polar Geospatial Center
 Center for Transportation Studies
 University of Minnesota Supercomputing Institute
 GroupLens Center for Social and Human-Centered Computing

Educational centers
 History of Science and Technology
 School of Mathematics Center for (K-12) Educational Programs
 Technological Leadership Institute
 UNITE Distributed Learning

References

External links

Official CSE website

University of Minnesota
Educational institutions established in 1935
1935 establishments in Minnesota
Engineering universities and colleges in Minnesota
Engineering schools and colleges in the United States